Kedhalia is a genus of plants in the family Zingiberaceae. 
It currently contains one known species, Kedhalia flaviflora, described by Lim Chong Keat. No subspecies are listed in the Catalog of Life.

References

Zingiberoideae
Zingiberaceae genera
Monotypic commelinid genera